Do You See Me? is Alyssa Milano's fourth studio album, and her last album consisting of new material. Released on September 18, 1992, it has a more mature sound and lyrics than the earlier albums. The album peaked at number 47 on the Japanese Oricon Albums Chart for a total of two weeks.

The album was released on CD by Canyon International in Japan, South Korea and Taiwan. It was also released on LP vinyl in South Korea only. In Japan it was packaged in a cardboard slipcase and with an extra 36-page booklet of photographs, just like her previous album, Locked Inside A Dream from 1991.

The album's only single was the title track "Do You See Me?". It was released on 18 September 1992 in Japan via Canyon International, as a 3" mini CD-single (snap-pack sleeve). The B-Side was the album track "If Only".

In the Republic of Korea, Milano appeared on the Saturday Night Music Show (MBC TV) on 26 September 1992, and performed the album track "Talk To Me".

Track listing

Singles

Chart performance

References

Alyssa Milano albums
1992 albums